Roeslerstammia pronubella is a species of moth belonging to the family Roeslerstammiidae.

It is native to Central Europe.

References

Roeslerstammiidae
Moths described in 1775
Moths of Europe
Taxa named by Michael Denis
Taxa named by Ignaz Schiffermüller